The Miryang Dang clan is a Korean clans. Their Bon-gwan is in Miryang, South Gyeongsang Province. According to the census held in 2000, there were 1013 members of the Miryang Dang clan. Their founder was  who was naturalized in Goryeo to avoid confliction in the end of Yuan dynasty. He was from Ningbo, Zhejiang, China. He was in charge of diplomacy as Gongjo. Then, he was appointed as Gongsin. After that, he worked as Minister of War and mayor of Kyan. He also got territory named Miryang. Finally, his descendant founded Miryang Dang clan and made their Bon-gwan Miryang.

See also 
 Korean clan names of foreign origin

References

External links 
 

 
Korean clan names of Chinese origin